Protein contact dermatitis is a cutaneous condition, and was a term originally used to describe an eczematous reaction to protein-containing material in food handlers.

See also 
 Rubber dermatitis
 List of cutaneous conditions

References 

Contact dermatitis